Early presidential elections were held in Brazil on 13 April 1919, following the death of Rodrigues Alves, who had been elected the previous year. The result was a victory for Epitácio Pessoa of the Paraíba Republican Party (and supported by the Paulista Republican Party and the Minas Republican Party), who received 71% of the vote.

Results

References

Presidential elections in Brazil
Brazil
1919 in Brazil
April 1919 events
Election and referendum articles with incomplete results
Elections of the First Brazilian Republic